WYRE (810 AM) is a radio station broadcasting an adult album alternative format. Licensed to Annapolis, Maryland, United States, it serves Annapolis and portions of the Baltimore, Maryland and Washington, DC areas.

The station started out as WASL, then several years later switched call letters to WIPA as it programmed a steady diet of uninterrupted Arthur Godfrey-style ukulele music.  Under Jacob Einstein's management tenure, the station switched calls again, to WABW (signalling their coverage of Annapolis, Baltimore and Washington).  Still an also-ran in the market, it received somewhat of a bump when it debuted Tony Donald, formerly from cross-town rival WNAV.  Donald later surfaced on the other side of the Chesapeake Bay in Cambridge, Maryland, at WCEM.

In the 1960s the station assumed its present call sign (WYRE) as a Top 40 station featuring air personalities Barry Richards (later to move to progressive music WHMC, Gaithersburg), Kirby Scott (in between stints at WSBA, York, PA and WCAO, Baltimore), Jack Alix (previously of WEAM and WPGC), Dennis Constantine (later of WMYQ and later crosstown WHYI Y100 Miami, FL; KTLK and later crosstown KBPI Denver, CO; KBCO Boulder, CO; KINK Portland, OR, KFOG San Francisco; and currently at KVNA-FM Prescott, AZ)  and Bob White.
 
On March 15, 2010, the station became part of the Top-40 KHZTV network with stations throughout Maryland including WAMD in Harford County and WKHZ in Easton.

On September 20, 2017, WYRE left the air due to a dispute with its landlord. The station filed for remain silent authority on January 11, 2018, which allows for up to six additional months of silence at the Federal Communications Commission's discretion. Pursuant to the Telecommunications Act of 1996, WYRE's license was subject to being  deleted if it did not broadcast again by September 19, 2018.

WYRE resumed broadcasting September 19, 2018, relaying WRNR-FM. In November 2020 the station flipped to oldies. As of February 11, 2023, WYRE began relaying the WRNR online stream after they sold their 103.1-FM frequency.  The broadcast/webcast plays a top of the hour legal ID that says, "The Voice of the Bay, WYRE, Annapolis and WRNR Online" with occasional "103.1 RNR" spot announcements in between songs.

References

External links
 http://www.khztv.com/

YRE
Radio stations established in 1947
1947 establishments in Maryland
YRE
Adult album alternative radio stations in the United States